Floodgate Entertainment was an American video game developer founded by Paul Neurath in 2000. Many of the company's employees are former Looking Glass Studios employees.

Floodgate co-developed Neverwinter Nights: Shadows of Undrentide alongside BioWare and Dark Messiah of Might and Magic alongside Arkane Studios. In 2006, they signed a deal with Sony BMG Music Entertainment to distribute their game Mo-Pets. On March 24, 2011, Floodgate was acquired by Zynga and merged with Zynga Boston.

References

Zynga
Privately held companies based in Massachusetts
Defunct companies based in Massachusetts
Companies based in Boston
Video game companies established in 2000
Video game companies disestablished in 2011
Defunct video game companies of the United States